Eileen Dupuch Carron, CMG (born 13 March 1930) is a lawyer and newspaper publisher in the Bahamas.

Personal life 
The daughter of Sir Étienne Dupuch and Lady Marie Dupuch, she was born Eileen Dupuch in Nassau and was educated at Queen's College and St. Francis Xavier's Academy before going abroad to study at St Francis' College in Hertfordshire, England. 

She went on to receive a BA in philosophy from St. Michael's College, Toronto, a master's degree in journalism from Columbia University Graduate School of Journalism in New York City, and to study law in London. 

She was married to the late Roger Peter Carron, until his death in 2009.

Career

In 1962, Carron became assistant editor at The Tribune newspaper in Nassau, the paper founded by her grandfather, Leon Dupuch, and edited by her father, Etienne. In the same year, she became the second woman called to the Bahamas Bar. 

She was recognized by the International Press Institute for her "never-ending commitment to free press and the highest journalistic standard".

In 1972, she became publisher for The Tribune, becoming only the second female publisher in The Bahamas. As at August 2019, she was, having served 47 years, the longest currently serving editor and publisher in the Bahamas.

In 1993, Carron became the first CEO of a private radio station, The People's Radio Station, 100 JAMZ.

Accomplishments

Carron became the first female pilot in the Bahamas during her twenties. She is the only Bahamian to have an editorial read into the record of the United States Senate.

In 2000, she was named a Companion of the Order of St Michael and St George.

References 

1930 births
Living people
Bahamian newspaper editors
Women newspaper editors
Bahamian newspaper publishers (people)
Bahamian lawyers
Companions of the Order of St Michael and St George
20th-century Bahamian lawyers
21st-century Bahamian lawyers
University of Toronto alumni
Columbia University Graduate School of Journalism alumni